The Soviet locomotive class IS was a Soviet passenger steam locomotive type named after Joseph Stalin. The contract design was prepared in 1929 at V.V. Kuybyshev Locomotive Factory in Kolomna, Russian SFSR. The IS series locomotives were manufactured between 1932 and 1942. The last one was built in 1942 during the Great Patriotic War against Nazi Germany .

Overview
The locomotive used the same cylinders and boilers as the FD series locomotives. However the IS steam locomotive had a 2-8-4 wheel arrangement.

Construction
The first steam locomotive was released from the Kolomna factory on October 4, 1932. In April–December a steam locomotive was tested on the October, Southern, and Ekaterinenskaya railways.

In 1936, production began at October Revolution Locomotive Factory in Voroshilovgrad, Ukrainian SSR (Luhansk, Ukraine). In total, 649 IS steam locomotives were constructed. Later the series was renamed FDP (steam locomotive FD, passenger modification).

Use
These locomotives were used until 1972.

Gallery

See also
 The Museum of the Moscow Railway, at Paveletsky Rail Terminal, Moscow
 Rizhsky Rail Terminal, Home of the Moscow Railway Museum
 Russian Railway Museum, St.Petersburg
 Finland Station, St.Petersburg
 History of rail transport in Russia

Books

References

External links

The Moscow Railway Museum at Rizhsky Rail Terminal

Railway locomotives introduced in 1932
2-8-4 locomotives
IS
5 ft gauge locomotives
1′D2′ h2 locomotives